A conservation-dependent species is a species which has been categorised as "Conservation Dependent" ("LR/cd") by the International Union for Conservation of Nature (IUCN), i.e. as dependent on conservation efforts to prevent it from becoming endangered. Such species must be the focus of a continuing species-specific and/or habitat-specific conservation programme, the cessation of which would result in the species qualifying for one of the threatened categories within a period of five years.

The category is part of the IUCN 1994 Categories & Criteria (version 2.3), which is no longer used in evaluation of taxa, but persists in the IUCN Red List for taxa evaluated prior to 2001, when version 3.1 was first used. Using the 2001 (v3.1) system these taxa are classed as near threatened, but those that have not been re-evaluated remain with the "Conservation Dependent" category.

, there remains 209 conservation-dependent plant species and 29 conservation-dependent animal species.

Examples of conservation-dependent species include the black caiman (Melanosuchus niger), the sinarapan, the California ground cricket, and the flowering plant Garcinia hermonii.

Conservation-dependent animals 

, the IUCN still lists 20 conservation-dependent animal species, and one conservation-dependent subpopulations or stocks.

Mollusks

Arthropods

EPBC Act 

In Australia, the Environment Protection and Biodiversity Conservation Act 1999 still uses a "Conservation Dependent" category for classifying fauna and flora species. Species recognised as "Conservation Dependent" do not receive special protection, as they are not considered "matters of national environmental significance under the EPBC Act".

The legislation uses categories similar to those of the IUCN 1994 Categories & Criteria. It does not, however, have a near threatened category or any other "lower risk" categories.

, only two species have received the status under the act:
Orange roughy (Hoplostethus atlanticus)
Southern bent-wing bat (Miniopterus schreibersii bassanii)

No flora has been given the category under the EPBC Act.

See also 
Conservation-reliant species
IUCN Red List conservation dependent species, ordered by taxonomic rank.
:Category:IUCN Red List conservation dependent species, ordered alphabetically.

References 

 
 
 01
IUCN Red List